Justine Cooper may refer to:

 Justine Cooper (Angel), a character in the TV series Angel
 Justine Cooper (artist) (born 1968), Australian artist